Fran Watters was an Ireland international footballer. Watters played for several clubs in the League of Ireland and in 1925–26 scored 15 goals for Shelbourne, helping them win their first ever League of Ireland title.

Playing career

Olympia
In 1917–18, together with Jack McCarthy, Watters was a member of the Olympia team that won both the Leinster Junior Cup and Leinster Senior Cup and reached the final of the IFA Junior Cup. In the Leinster Senior Cup final against Shelbourne, Watters scored the only goal in a 1–0 win.

League of Ireland
In the 1925–26 season while playing for Shelbourne, Watters formed a successful partnership with John Simpson. Between them Watters and Simpson scored 32 goals, helping  Shelbourne win their first League of Ireland title. Watters 15 goals also saw him called up to the Ireland squad. The following season, he played for Brideville and helped them reach the 1926–27 FAI Cup final which they lost 1–0 after a replay to Drumcondra. In 1928–29 Watters joined Shamrock Rovers. On 28 October 1928 he scored a hat–trick for Rovers in an 11–0 win against Bray Unknowns. John Joe Flood also scored a hat–trick while Bob Fullam scored twice. This result remains Rovers all-time record win.

Ireland international
On 21 March 1926, while playing for Shelbourne, Watters made his one and only appearance for Ireland in an away friendly against Italy. Watters was originally included in the squad as a reserve. However, when Ned Brooks had to withdraw due to the death of his son, Watters found himself in the starting eleven.

Honours

Olympia
Leinster Senior Cup
Winners: 1917–18
Leinster Junior Cup
Winners: 1917–18
IFA Junior Cup
Runners Up: 1917–18

Shelbourne
League of Ireland
Winners: 1925–26

Brideville
FAI Cup
Runners Up: 1926–27

References

Year of birth missing
Place of birth missing
Year of death missing
Republic of Ireland association footballers
Republic of Ireland international footballers
Shelbourne F.C. players
Drumcondra F.C. players
Shamrock Rovers F.C. players
League of Ireland players
Association football forwards